Ole Lund Kirkegaard (29 July 1940, in Aarhus – 24 March 1979) was a Danish writer of children's and youth literature, as well as a teacher. He mainly wrote about the interactions between adults and children. The main character in his books is usually an anti-hero. In 1969, he was awarded with the Danish Ministry of Culture's children book prize (Kulturministeriets Børnebogspris)

Kirkegaard grew up in Skanderborg just south of Aarhus, and many of his stories were inspired by his own childhood experiences there. He also illustrated his own books. On a cold winter night in Kirkegaard in 1979, after having had too much to drink, he fell in the snow on his way home and could not get up again. He froze to death on location, at just 38 years of age. A street in Skanderborg is named after him (Ole Lund Kirkegaards Stræde).

Bibliography 
In Danish:

 Lille Virgil (lit. Little Virgil), 1967
 Albert, 1968
 Orla Frøsnapper (lit. Orla Frogsnapper), 1969
 Hodja fra Pjort (lit. Hodja from Pjort), 1970
 Otto er et næsehorn (lit. Otto is a rhinoceros), 1972
 Gummi-Tarzan (lit. Rubber-Tarzan), 1975
 En flodhest i huset (lit. A hippopotamus in the house), 1978
 Frode og alle de andre rødder (lit. Frode and all the other rascals), 1979
 Per og bette Mads (lit. Per and wee Mads), 1981
 Mig og Bedstefar - og så Nisse Pok (lit. Me and Grandpa - and Pok the Pixi too), 1982
 Tippe Tophat og andre fortællinger (lit. Tippe Tophat and other stories), 1982
 Anton og Arnold flytter til byen (lit. Anton and Arnold move to the city), 1988
 Anton og Arnold i det vilde vesten (lit. Anton and Arnold in the wild west), 1988
 Frække Friderik (lit. Naughty Friderik), 2008

Only a few of his works have been translated into English. This includes:

 "Otto is a Rhino: Story and Drawings", Addison-Wesley Pub. Co., 1976

Films
The stories of Ole Lund Kirkegaard have inspired several Danish films, including a TV series in 1977.

Sources and further reading

References 

1940 births
1979 deaths
Danish educators
Danish children's writers
Danish children's book illustrators
People from Aarhus
Deaths from hypothermia
People from Skanderborg Municipality